The 2011 MasterCard Tennis Cup was a professional tennis tournament played on hard courts. It was the eleventh edition of the tournament which was part of the 2011 ATP Challenger Tour and the tenth edition for the 2011 ITF Women's Circuit. It took place in Campos do Jordão, Brazil between 25 and 31 July for women and 1 and 7 August 2011 for men.

ATP entrants

Seeds

 1 Rankings are as of July 25, 2011.

Other entrants
The following players received wildcards into the singles main draw:
  Guilherme Clézar
  Marcelo Demoliner
  Thiago Moura Monteiro
  João Pedro Sorgi

The following players received entry from the qualifying draw:
  Cristián Benedetti
  Fabiano de Paula
  Tiago Lopes
  Thales Turini

WTA entrants

Seeds

 1 Rankings are as of July 18, 2011.

Other entrants 
The following players received wildcards into the singles main draw:
  Maria Danzini
  Paula Cristina Gonçalves
  Beatriz Haddad Maia
  Eduarda Piai

The following players received entry from the qualifying draw:
  Gabriela Cé
  Natasha Fourouclas
  Priscila Garcia
  Patricia Kú Flores
  Belen Luduena
  Laura Pigossi
  Kyra Shroff
  Karina Souza

Champions

Men's singles

 Rogério Dutra da Silva def.  Izak van der Merwe, 6–4, 6–7(7–5), 6–3

Women's singles

 Verónica Cepede Royg def.  Adriana Pérez, 7–6(7–4), 7–5

Men's doubles

 Juan Sebastián Cabal /  Robert Farah def.  Ricardo Hocevar /  Júlio Silva, 6–2, 6–3

Women's doubles

 Fernanda Hermenegildo /  Teliana Pereira def.  Maria Fernanda Alves /  Roxane Vaisemberg, 3–6, 7–6(7–5), [11–9]

External links
Official Website
ITF Search 
ITF Search 
ATP official site

MasterCard Tennis Cup
MasterCard Tennis Cup
MasterCard Tennis Cup
MasterCard Tennis Cup
MasterCard Tennis Cup
2011 in Brazilian tennis
Tennis tournaments in Brazil